Padmanabhan Srikanth "Sri" Srinivasan (born February 23, 1967) is an Indian-born American lawyer and jurist serving as the chief judge of the U.S. Court of Appeals for the District of Columbia Circuit. Before he was a circuit judge, Srinivasan served as Principal Deputy Solicitor General of the United States and argued 25 cases before the United States Supreme Court. He has also lectured at Harvard Law School.

In 2016, Srinivasan was considered by President Barack Obama as a potential nominee to the Supreme Court of the United States after the death of Antonin Scalia; Obama nominated Merrick Garland instead.

Early life and education 

Srinivasan was born in Chandigarh, India to Brahmin Iyengar Hindu Tamil parents. His father, Thirunankovil Padmanabhan Srinivasan, was from Mela Thiruvenkatanathapuram, a village near Tirunelveli, Tamil Nadu. Srinivasan's family first came to the United States in the late 1960s when his father had a Fulbright fellowship at the University of California, Berkeley. After briefly returning to India, Srinivasan's family permanently immigrated to the United States in 1971 when Srinivasan was four years old. They settled in  Lawrence, Kansas, where Srinivasan's father was a professor of mathematics at the University of Kansas. Srinivasan's mother, Saroja, taught at the Kansas City Art Institute and later worked at the University of Kansas's computer science department. Srinivasan graduated from Lawrence High School in 1985, where he played on the school basketball team alongside future NBA star Danny Manning.

After high school, Srinivasan attended Stanford University, graduating in 1989 with a Bachelor of Arts degree with distinction. He worked as a management analyst for the San Mateo County county manager's office from 1989 to 1991, then did joint studies at the Stanford Law School and Stanford Graduate School of Business, receiving a JD–MBA in 1995. He was an editor of the Stanford Law Review and graduated with Order of the Coif honors.

Career 

After law school, Srinivasan worked as a law clerk for United States Court of Appeals for the Fourth Circuit Judge J. Harvie Wilkinson III and then was a clerk for United States Supreme Court Associate Justice Sandra Day O'Connor.

After his clerkships, Srinivasan worked for the law firm O'Melveny & Myers and then joined the office of the United States Solicitor General, where he worked from 2002 until 2007. He rejoined O'Melveny & Myers in 2007 as a partner, and was the firm's hiring partner for its Washington, D.C. office. While at the firm, he represented ExxonMobil for accusations of human rights abuses by hired military personnel at an Indonesian gas plant. In 2010, he represented former Enron executive Jeffrey Skilling in his appeal before the U.S. Supreme Court, which challenged the "honest services" fraud statute and also that Skilling's trial was never moved from Houston. The Supreme Court ruled in favor of Skilling on the "honest services" fraud statute, but rejected the trial location argument.

Srinivasan also was a lecturer at Harvard Law School, where he co-taught a course on Supreme Court and appellate advocacy. In 2005 he received the Office of the Secretary of Defense Award for Excellence from the United States Department of Defense.

On August 26, 2011, Srinivasan was appointed to replace Neal Katyal as Principal Deputy Solicitor General of the United States. As of May 2013, Srinivasan had argued 25 cases before the U.S. Supreme Court. Earlier in his career, he also performed pro bono work for presidential candidate Al Gore during the aftermath of the 2000 presidential election.

In 2013, he was part of the legal team that presented arguments before the Supreme Court against the Defense of Marriage Act in the case of United States v. Windsor.

He left the Solicitor General's office on May 24, 2013, upon being commissioned as a Judge of the D.C. Circuit.

Federal judicial service 

In March 2010, National Review blogger Edward Whelan wrote that the Obama administration had been considering nominating Srinivasan to one of two vacancies on the United States Court of Appeals for the District of Columbia Circuit and that the idea of nominating Srinivasan had run into opposition from some Obama supporters because of Srinivasan's work in the U.S. Solicitor General's office during the Bush administration, and union animosity to Srinivasan's corporate clients in private practice.

In June 2012, Obama nominated Srinivasan to the seat on the D.C. Circuit. On January 2, 2013, his nomination was returned to the President, due to the sine die adjournment of the Senate; the next day he was renominated to the same office.

His Senate confirmation hearing on April 10, 2013 was uneventful. His nomination was reported out of committee on May 16, 2013, by a 18–0 vote. A final vote on his nomination took place on May 23, 2013, where he was confirmed by a 97–0 vote. He received his commission on May 24, 2013. 
He took the oath of office before Chief Judge Merrick Garland in June. At his formal swearing-in ceremony in September, administered by retired Supreme Court justice Sandra Day O'Connor, he took the oath on the Hindu holy book Bhagavad Gita and became the first federal appellate judge of South Asian descent. He became Chief Judge on February 11, 2020.

Notable decisions
In Sierra Club v. Jewell, 764 F. 3d 1 (2014), Srinivasan authored the majority opinion in the D.C. Circuit's split decision holding that environmental groups seeking to protect the site of the historic Battle of Blair Mountain possessed Article III standing to challenge the removal of the site from the National Register of Historic Places in federal court.

Srinivasan authored the D.C. Circuit's decision in Pom Wonderful v. FTC, 777 F.3d 478 (2015), which upheld FTC regulations that require health-related advertising claims be supported by clinical studies while simultaneously trimming the number of studies required on First Amendment grounds.

In Home Care Association of America v. Weil, 799 F. 3d 1084 (2015), Srinivasan authored the D.C. Circuit's decision reinstating, under Chevron deference, regulations that guarantee overtime and minimum wage protection to home health care workers, citing "dramatic transformation" of the home care industry over the past forty years as reason for the change.

Srinivasan authored the D.C. Circuit's decision in Hodge v. Talkin, 799 F. 3d 1145 (2015), which upheld a federal law prohibiting demonstrations in the U.S. Supreme Court Building's plaza as justified by the Supreme Court's interest in not giving the appearance of being influenced by public opinion and as consistent with nonpublic forum viewpoint-neutral restrictions, where demonstrations could proceed on nearby public sidewalks.

In Jarkesy v. SEC, 803 F. 3d 9 (2015), Srinivasan authored the D.C. Circuit's decision holding that the securities laws under the Dodd–Frank Act provide an exclusive avenue for judicial review that plaintiffs may not bypass by filing suit in district court.

Srinivasan authored the D.C. Circuit's decision in Simon v. Republic of Hungary, Slip Op. (2016), holding that Article 27 of the Foreign Sovereign Immunities Act merely creates a floor on compensation for Holocaust survivors because the text of the 1947 peace treaty between Hungary and the Allies does not bar claims outside of the treaty and because the Allies "lacked the power to eliminate (or waive) the claims of" Hungary's own citizens against their government.

In a July 6, 2021 ruling, The Judge Rotenberg Educational Center, Inc. v. FDA, Srinivasan dissented when the majority overturned the FDA's ban on shocking devices, which the Judge Rotenberg Educational Center uses to torture autistic and disabled students. "The result of the majority's ruling," he wrote, is to "force" the FDA to either "abolish a highly beneficial use" of a device "so it can stamp out a highly risky one," or to "stomach the highly risky use so it can preserve the highly beneficial one."

Supreme Court consideration 

In April 2013, Mother Jones suggested that Srinivasan ultimately might be nominated by President Obama for the Supreme Court of the United States; during the same month, Jeffrey Toobin also opined that should he be confirmed for the D.C. Circuit, he would be Obama's next nominee to the Supreme Court. If he had been nominated, he would have been the first Indian American, first Asian American and first Hindu candidate for the Supreme Court.

Following the death of Supreme Court Justice Antonin Scalia on February 13, 2016, Srinivasan was again widely speculated to be among the most likely contenders to be appointed to fill the seat, prior to the nomination of Merrick Garland. After Senate Majority Leader Mitch McConnell threatened to refuse to consider any Obama appointee to fill the seat in an election year, and split political parties in government, it was thought that Srinivasan, who was confirmed 97–0 in 2013, would be politically difficult to block, had he been nominated.

Personal life 

Srinivasan lives in Arlington County, Virginia. He has two children.

See also
 Barack Obama Supreme Court candidates
 Joe Biden Supreme Court candidates
 List of Asian American jurists
 List of first minority male lawyers and judges in the United States
 List of law clerks of the Supreme Court of the United States (Seat 8)

References

External links

|-

|-

1967 births
Living people
20th-century American lawyers
21st-century American judges
21st-century American lawyers
American Hindus
American jurists of Indian descent
American politicians of Indian descent
American people of Indian Tamil descent
Indian emigrants to the United States
Judges of the United States Court of Appeals for the D.C. Circuit
Law clerks of the Supreme Court of the United States
People associated with O'Melveny & Myers
People from Arlington County, Virginia
People from Lawrence, Kansas
Scholars from Chandigarh
Stanford Graduate School of Business alumni
Stanford Law School alumni
United States court of appeals judges appointed by Barack Obama